Zakharovo is a rural locality (a village) in Golovinskoye Rural Settlement, Sudogodsky District, Vladimir Oblast, Russia. The population was 74 as of 2010.

Geography 
Zakharovo is located 27 km northwest of Sudogda (the district's administrative centre) by road. Yefimovskaya is the nearest rural locality.

References 

Rural localities in Sudogodsky District